The following are the winners of the 24th annual (1997) Origins Award, presented at Origins 1998:

References

External links
 1997 Origins Awards Winners

1997 awards
1997 awards in the United States
Origins Award winners